List of ambassadors of India may refer to:

List of ambassadors of India to Bhutan
List of ambassadors of India to Germany
List of ambassadors of India to Greece
List of ambassadors of India to Madagascar
List of ambassadors of India to Russia
List of ambassadors of India to the United States